Hayk Margaryan (born June 28, 1985), better known by his stage name HT Hayko, is an Armenian rapper from Yerevan, Armenia.

Early life
Hayk Margaryan was born on June 28, 1985 in Yerevan. He graduated from School No.55 after Chekhov. Then he went to Sayat-Nova Musical School, where he learned how to play piano and trumpet. Later, Hayk graduated from the State Engineering University as an electrician.

Music career
Hayko started his music career in 2001, when he founded the Hay Tgheq group with Misho. It was the first ever rap group in Armenia. Together they released two albums, eight music videos, and held concerts in Armenia as well as other countries. It dissolved in 2007. Since then, Misho and Hayko work separately.

AntiSystem
On May 15, 2012, a song named AntiSystem was uploaded on HT Hayko's YouTube Channel. It is a political hip hop influenced by the Mashtots Park Movement. It especially inspired the youth to take actions against injustice in Armenia. The song also talked about the dismissing of Suren Zolyan as president of Yerevan State Linguistic University, which was protested by hundreds students. After one month, the video gained more than 50,000 views.

Discography

Hay Tgheq albums
Hay Tgheq (Հայ Տղեք) - 2004
Mi Katil Meghr (Մի Կաթիլ Մեղր) - 2006

Solo albums
Passed stage (Անցած էտապ) - 2008
Quansh (Քուանշ) - 2009

References

1985 births
Living people
Armenian rappers
Hip hop singers